Alice Blanche Legh (1855 – 3 January 1948) was a famous British archer. She has been called "the greatest British woman archer of all-time" and "the greatest British archer ever".

From 1881 to 1922, she won the national ladies' archery championship twenty-three times. In 1908, she declined to compete at the London Olympics in order to prepare for her defense of the national title a week later. She successfully defended the title against Queenie Newall, the Olympic gold medal winner, by a large margin. She held the title for a record eight consecutive years between 1902 and 1909. The only international competition she is known to have participated in is a contest at Le Touquet in 1905, although the opportunity was open to her on several occasions. She retired from archery in 1922 at the age of sixty-seven.

Legh died at Resthaven nursing home in Stroud, Gloucestershire, on 3 January 1948. She is buried at Minchinhampton.

External links
 Alice Blanche Legh Career Summary at The Archer's Register.com

References

1855 births
1948 deaths
British female archers